KPRV-FM 92.5 FM is a radio station licensed to Heavener, Oklahoma.  The station broadcasts a format consisting of classic country and classic hits as well as Gospel music on Sundays. KPRV-FM is owned by Leroy Billy.

References

External links
KPRV-FM's official website

PRV-FM
Classic country radio stations in the United States
Classic hits radio stations in the United States